Marion Ursula Marsha Vadhanapanich  (born 24 August 1970) is a Thai pop singer, model and actress.

Early life and education
Vadhanapanich was born in West Germany to a Thai Chinese father and a German mother. In 1986, Vadhanapanich graduated from Benjamarachalai School while already in the entertainment industry. Following high school, she received a degree from Assumption University.

Selected filmography
Films
 Tamruat lek (1986)
 Rak noi na (1986)
 Wanali (1986)
 Chip (1986)
 Phet sian thong (1987)
 Wai priao puek puek (1987)
 Om kot satan (1987)
 Kwa Ja Roo Dieng Sa (1987)
 Tawan phloeng (1987)
 Fa si thong (1987)
 Wun thisut .. . sadut rak (1987)
 Pisat si ngoen (1988)
 Chongrak (1988)
 Phetchakhat si chomphu (1988)
 Wiwa chamlaeng (1988)
 Ichu ku pu pa (1988)
 Ma (1989)
Alone (2007)
Phobia 2 (2009)
Dark Flight (2012)
Love on the rock (2014)

Television
Kwa Ja Roo Dieng Sa (1988)
Yu phuea rak
Fai chon saeng
Wang namwon
Somsongsaeng
Nangsao mai chamkat namsakun
Hong nuea mangkon
 Jao Sao Mue Ar Cheap
 Boung Ban Ja Thorn
Kho phlik fa tam la thoe
Che dan .. . chan rak thoe
Likhit saneha
 Rock Letter (2017)

Selected television programmes 

 The Face Thailand (season 3) (2017)

Selected concerts
 Marsha Marshow
 Marsha Tastes
 One Fine day With Marsha
 Marsha My Reflection
 Marsha Open Heart
 Seven Live In Bangkok
 Sleepless Society Concert
 This Is It Concert (Tribute to Michael Jackson)
 Green Concert#16 Seven Return

References

External links
 

1970 births
Living people
Marsha Vadhanapanich
Marsha Vadhanapanich
Marsha Vadhanapanich
Marsha Vadhanapanich
Marsha Vadhanapanich